Pickaninny (also picaninny, piccaninny or pickinninie) is a pidgin word for a small child, possibly derived from the Portuguese  ('boy, child, very small, tiny'). In North America, pickaninny is a racial slur for African American children. It can also refer to a derogatory caricature of a dark-skinned child of African descent.

Origins and usage
The origins of the word pickaninny (and its alternative spellings picaninny and piccaninny) are disputed; it may derive from the Portuguese term for a small child, . It was apparently used in the seventeenth century by enslaved people in the West Indies to refer affectionately to a child of any race. Pickaninny acquired a pejorative connotation by the nineteenth century as a term for black children in the United States and Britain, as well as aboriginal children of the Americas, Australia, and New Zealand.

Pidgin languages
The term piccanin, derived from the Portuguese , has along with several variants become widely used in pidgin languages, meaning 'small'. This term is common in the creole languages of the Caribbean, especially those which are English-based.

It can be heard in songs by African popular musicians such as Fela Kuti's Afrobeat song "Teacher Don't Teach Me Nonsense" and Prince Nico Mbarga's highlife song "Sweet Mother". Both are from Nigeria.

The word  is used in Tok Pisin, Solomon Pijin and Bislama (the English-based creole languages of Papua New Guinea, Solomon Islands and Vanuatu, respectively) the word for 'child' or 'children'.

United States

In the Southern United States, pickaninny was long used to refer to the children of African slaves or (later) of any dark-skinned African American. The term is now generally considered offensive in the U.S.

The character of Topsy in Harriet Beecher Stowe's 1852 anti-slavery novel Uncle Tom's Cabin became the basis for the popular caricature of the pickaninny, described by scholar Debbie Olson as "a coon character [...] untamed, genderless, with wide eyes, hair sticking up all around the child's head, and often 'stuffing their wide mouths with watermelon or chicken. These characters were a popular feature of minstrel shows into the twentieth century. According to historian Robin Bernstein:

Commonwealth countries 
Piccaninny is considered an offensive term for an Aboriginal Australian child. It was used in colonial Australia and is still in use in some Indigenous Kriol languages. 
Piccaninny (sometimes spelled picanninnie) is found in numerous Australian place names, such as Piccaninnie Ponds and Piccaninny Lake in South Australia, Piccaninny crater and Picaninny Creek in Western Australia and Picaninny Point in Tasmania.

The term was used in 1831 in an anti-slavery tract "The History of Mary Prince, a West Indian Slave, related by herself" published in Edinburgh, Scotland. In 1826 an Englishman named Thomas Young was tried at the Old Bailey in London on a charge of enslaving and selling four Gabonese women known as "Nura, Piccaninni, Jumbo Jack and Prince Quarben". The New Partridge Dictionary of Slang and Unconventional English says that in the United Kingdom today, piccaninny is considered highly offensive and derogatory, or negative and judgemental when used by other black people. It was controversially used ("wide-grinning picaninnies") by the British Conservative politician Enoch Powell in his 1968 "Rivers of Blood" speech. In a 2002 column for The Daily Telegraph, Boris Johnson wrote, "It is said that the Queen has come to love the Commonwealth, partly because it supplies her with regular cheering crowds of flag-waving piccaninnies."

In popular culture

Literature
 1911In the novel Peter and Wendy by J. M. Barrie, the Indians of Neverland are members of the Piccaninny tribe. Sarah Laskow describes them as "a blanket stand-in for 'others' of all stripes, from Aboriginal populations in Australia to descendants of slaves in the United States" who generally communicate in pidgin with lines such as "Ugh, ugh, wah!".
 1936In Margaret Mitchell's best-selling epic Gone with the Wind, the character Melanie Wilkes objects to her husband's intended move to New York City because it would mean that their son Beau would be educated alongside "Yankees" and "pickaninnies".

Television
 2015Season 1 Episode 14 of Shark Tank Australia featured Piccaninny Tiny Tots which has since changed its name to Kakadu Tiny Tots.
 2020Episode 8 (Jig-A-Bobo) of the HBO television series Lovecraft Country features a character chased by Topsy and Bopsy, two ghoulish monsters depicted as "pickaninny" caricatures.

Related terms

Cognates of the term appear in other languages and cultures, presumably also derived from the Portuguese word, and it is not controversial or derogatory in these contexts.

The term  is found in Melanesian pidgin and creole languages such as Tok Pisin of Papua New Guinea or Bislama of Vanuatu, as the usual word for 'child' (of a person or animal); it may refer to children of any race.

In Nigerian as well as Cameroonian Pidgin English, the word  is used to mean a child. And in Sierra Leone Krio the term  refers to 'child' or 'children', while in Liberian English the term  does likewise. In Sranan Tongo and Ndyuka of Suriname the term  may refer to 'children' as well as to 'small' or 'little'.

See also

References

Further reading

External links
 
 
 Online exhibit of stereotypical portrayals of African Americans, Haverford College

Anti-African and anti-black slurs
Fictional African-American people
Portuguese words and phrases
Black people in art
Stereotypes of African Americans